Yubo Fernández (born 27 November 1979, in Santo Domingo, Dominican Republic) is a Dominican actress. Fernández received awards for her acting performance in Barcelona, Toronto, Los Angeles, and Arizona.

Education
Fernández studied Marketing at APEC University in Santo Domingo. She lived 10 years in New York City,  studying acting at Atlantic Film School, NYC,  accents in Edge Studio NYC and cinematography in Altos de Chavón School. She received coaching from John Strasberg of the Lee Strasberg Theater and Film Institute and coaching with Claude Kerven board director of cinematography in NYFA.

Acting
She participated in the Broadway work The Lost Widow. She played a role in El Encuentro, the work of director Alfonso Rodriguez. She starred in How we Kill Luisa in 2016  In 2017 Fernandez started a campaign of cancer awareness, releasing an international calendar with top Dominican models. She also work as a freelance model.

In July 2019 Fernandez presented her third play at Broadway New York City, a monologue called “Late for Martinis”. Written and directed by Cuban Playwright, Screenwriter and Director Alejandro Normand, adapted to English language by Yubo Fernandez.

Awards
 Barcelona Planet Film Festival: Best Actress 
 One World Toronto Film Festival: Best Actress
 L.A Shorts Awards :Best Actress (Diamond Award) 
 Platinum Award ( Platinum Award)
 Hollywood Blv Fest: Best Short Film, Best Actress
 Chandler Film Fest: Short Film, Best Actress 
 Barcelona Planet Film Festival (Barcelona, España) 
 Real Time Film Festival (Lagos, Nigeria) 
 Film Noir Festival (Albert, Francia)
 Hollywood independent Film Festival (Los Angeles, EU) L.A. Shorts Awards (Los Angeles, EU)
 Hollywood Blvd Film Festival (Los Angeles, EU) Indi Wise Film Festival (FLorida, EU)
 Miami Independent Film Festival (Florida, EU) Chandler Itln Film Festival (Arizona, EU)
 LA independent Film Fest Awards (Los Angeles, EU)

References

External links
 Official Website
 

Hispanic and Latino American actresses
Living people
Dominican Republic actresses
1979 births
21st-century American women